Alexander Görlach is an academic journalist and entrepreneur. He was visiting scholar at the College of Harvard University, at Adams House,
 John F. Kennedy Memorial Fellow to Harvard's Center for European Studies and fellow of the Harvard Divinity School. Görlach is currently a senior research associate at Cambridge University, at the Institute on Religion and International Studies. Prior to that he served at the Center for Humanities (CRASH) at Cambridge University as fellow. He is the founder of the debate-magazine The European, that he also ran as its editor in chief from 2009–2015. Today he publishes www.saveliberaldemocracy.com and serves as an op-ed contributor to the New York Times, Neue Zurcher Zeitung, and a columnist to the business magazine Wirtschaftswo he.

Personal life
Görlach was born as the child of Turkish migrant workers in Ludwigshafen, Germany. Shortly afterwards, he was adopted and raised by a German family.

Studies
After graduating from High School, Görlach received a scholarship from the Konrad-Adenauer-Stiftung and subsequently studied Catholic theology and philosophy at University of Mainz, Pontifical Gregorian University in Rome as well as Al-Azhar University in Cairo and the Faculty of Theology in Ankara. He also studied German studies, Political Science and music. He received his PhD in comparative religion from Ludwig Maximilian University of Munich in 2006 and in linguistics, in the field of language and politics, from University of Mainz in 2009.

Political affiliation
Alexander Görlach is a member of the German Liberal Party (FDP), joining in September 2016 after having been a member of the German Christian Democratic Party (CDU) for ten years.

Professional life
Görlach has been working and publishing for several German media outlets, such as ZDF, German Television. He has been and is published in several German media outlets such as Die Welt, Frankfurter Allgemeine Zeitung, Süddeutsche Zeitung, Die Zeit and Focus magazine. From 2007 to 2009 he was executive editor of the online part of Cicero magazine. Today he is focused on international publications: He is an op-ed contributor to the New York Times and to The World Post.

References

1976 births
Living people
German journalists
German male journalists
German columnists
German opinion journalists
German male writers
German people of Turkish descent
German magazine founders